The 2021–22 Adelaide Lightning season is the 30th season for the franchise in the Women's National Basketball League (WNBL).

Roster

Standings

Results

Regular season

Finals

Semi-finals

References

External links
Adelaide Lightning Official website

2021–22 WNBL season
WNBL seasons by team
Basketball,Adelaide Lightning
2021 in basketball
2021 in women's basketball
2021–22 in Australian basketball